Geetingsville is an unincorporated community on the border of Owen and Warren townships in Clinton County, Indiana.

History
Never officially platted, the village of Geetingsville was a small social and business center with a general store, a blacksmith shop and a physician (Dr. M. V. Young).  In the 1880s the Presbyterians erected a brick church in Geetingsville.

Geetingsville had a post office between 1856 and 1905. Henry W. Geeting served as postmaster.

Geography

References

Unincorporated communities in Clinton County, Indiana
Unincorporated communities in Indiana